Alton is a small rural community in south Taranaki, in the western North Island of New Zealand. It is located between the towns of Hāwera and Patea.

Further reading

General historical works

Business history

See    This dairy company began production in 1909, and closed upon merging with Kiwi Co-operative Dairies (in Hāwera) in 1984.

Churches

Anglican

See

Schools

South Taranaki District
Populated places in Taranaki